Three ships in the United States Navy have been named USS Lafayette for Marquis de Lafayette.

, was built in 1848 as Aleck Scott, and purchased by the US Navy on 18 May 1862 and renamed Lafayette 8 September 1862. She was decommissioned in July 1865 and sold
, was launched as the French built Normandie and seized from France in 1941. She was partially destroyed by fire during conversion to a troop ship in New York. She was sold to a US scrap merchant then struck in 1945

United States Navy ship names